The ZF 4HP20 is a four-speed automatic transmission for passenger cars from ZF Friedrichshafen AG.  Introduced in 1995, it remains in production, and has been used in a variety of cars from Citroën, Lancia, Mercedes-Benz, Peugeot, and Renault.

Applications
1996–2004 Peugeot 406 V6 3.0
1996–2003 Mercedes-Benz Vito
1996–2003 Mercedes-Benz V-Class
1997–2001 Citroën Xantia V6 2.9
1997–2001 Citroën XM V6 2.9
1997–1999 Peugeot 605 V6 2.9
1998–2002 Alfa Romeo 166 V6 2.5, V6 3.0
1998–2005 Lancia Kappa, Phedra V6 3.0
1998–2008 Renault Laguna 3.0
1998–2002 Renault Espace V6 3.0
1999–2000 Renault Safrane V6 3.0 24V
2001–2008 Citroën C5 and Citroën C8 V6 2.9, Peugeot 807 V6 2.9 and Peugeot 607 with DW12 2.2 HDi
2004–2010 Peugeot 407 with DW12 2.2 HDi
2003–2006 Fiat Ducato 2.8 JTD(244 Baumuster)

See also
List of ZF transmissions
The maximum torque capacity is 330 Nm.

References

4HP20